Brown Brothers Milawa Vineyard  is a family-owned wine company based in Milawa, Victoria, Australia.  Brown Brothers was founded in 1889 by John Francis Brown and continues to be owned and operated by his descendants on the original property. Brown Brothers makes wine from a wide range of grape varieties and into a range of styles.

History 
In 2009, Brown Brothers was asked to join Australian wine alliance Australia's First Families of Wine a multimillion-dollar venture to help resurrect the fortunes of the $6 billion industry highlighting the quality and diversity of Australian wine. The 12 member alliance includes Brown Brothers, Campbells, Taylors, DeBortoli, McWilliam’s, Tahbilk, Tyrell’s, Yalumba, D'Arenberg, Howard Park, Jim Barry and Henschke. The main criteria are that the family-owned companies need to have a "landmark wine" in their portfolios listed under Langton’s Classification and/or 75% agreement by group that a wine is considered "iconic", must have the ability to do at least a 20-year vertical tasting, have a history going back a minimum of two generations, ownership of vineyards more than 50 years old and/or ownership of distinguished sites which exemplify the best of terroir, commitment to export and environmental best practice, appropriate cellar door experience, and be paid-up members of the Winemakers Federation of Australia.

Grape varieties
Brown Brothers is known for including uncommon and novel grape varieties in their product line, including Cienna, Tarrango, and Mystique, alongside classic grapes.

Brown Brothers has made wine from the following grape varieties over the years.
 White: Arneis, Chenin blanc, Chardonnay, Chasselas, Colombard, Crouchen, Flora, Gewürztraminer, Sauvignon blanc, Gordo, Marsanne, Moscato, Muscat of Alexandria (Lexia), Orange Muscat, Pinot grigio, Rhine Riesling, Roussanne, Sultana, Sylvaner, Trebbiano, Verdelho, Viognier, Vermentino, White Frontignac
 Red: Aglianico, Barbera, Cabernet Franc, Cabernet Sauvignon, Cienna, Dolcetto, Durif, Graciano, Lagrein, Malbec, Marzemino, Merlot, Mystique, Meunier, Mondeuse, Nebbiolo, Petit Verdot, Pinot noir, Ruby Cabernet, Sangiovese, Schioppettino, Shiraz, Tarrango, Tempranillo, Zinfandel

Wine styles
Fortified: The fortified wine has been in a range of styles including Tawny Port, Ruby Port, Vintage Port, Flor Fino Sherry, Sweet Sherry, Muscat & Tokay.
Table Wine: The table wines have ranged from dry to sweet, usually straight varietals, but occasionally blends such as Shiraz/Cabernet, Shiraz/Mondeuse/Cabernet (SMC)
Dessert Wine: The dessert wines have included a blend of the Orange Muscat & Flora varieties and a Botrytis Riesling labeled Noble Riesling. 
Sparkling Wine: The Sparkling wines are mostly in the Méthode Champenoise with grapes from the Whitlands vineyard but there has also been other styles such as a Sparkling Shiraz. Brown Brothers are also a leader in King Valley Prosecco, and also blends of Lexia and Cienna for its Rosé, and also with natural flavourings.  It is known as Zibbibo, a synonym for Muscat of Alexandria

Vineyards
Brown Brothers has vineyards in Victoria, Australia and Tasmania, Australia with a variety of climates and soil types.

Milawa, Victoria (Established: 1885 ) Varieties: Merlot, Riesling, Cabernet Sauvignon, Dolcetto, Graciano, Mondeuse, Shiraz & White Frontignac.
Mystic Park, Victoria (Established: 1968 ) Varieties: Cienna, Dolcetto, Tarrango, Orange Muscat, Flora, Crouchen, Shiraz, Colombard & Chardonnay
Banksdale, Victoria (Established: 1994 ) Varieties: Chardonnay, Cabernet Sauvignon, Shiraz, Pinot grigio, Viognier & Tempranillo
Kayena, Tasmania (Established: 1994) Varieties: Riesling, Sauvignon blanc, Pinot gris, Gewurztraminer, Chardonnay, Gewürztraminer, Cabernet, Alvarinho, Viognier & Pinot noir
Heathcote, Victoria (Established: 1999 ) Varieties: Shiraz, Merlot, Durif, Malbec, Sangiovese, Tempranillo, Petit Verdot, Dolcetto & Pinot grigio
Devil's Corner (Established: 2005) Varieties: Pinot noir, Chardonnay, Sauvignon blanc, Pinot gris, Riesling, Gewurztraminer & Savagnin
The Hazards, Tasmania

References

External links
 Brown Brothers website
 Australia's first families of Wine

Wineries in Victoria (Australia)
Privately held companies of Australia
Food and drink companies established in 1889
1889 establishments in Australia
Rural City of Wangaratta
Family-owned companies of Australia